The following lists events that happened during 2014 in Haiti.

Incumbents
President: Michel Martelly
Prime Minister: Laurent Lamothe (until 20 December), Florence Duperval Guillaume (acting) (starting 20 December)

Events

May
 May 13 - Investigators claim to have found the wreck of Christopher Columbus's flagship, the Santa Maria, off the north coast of Haiti.

October
 October 4 - Jean-Claude Duvalier, leader of Haiti from his father's death in 1971 until his overthrow by a popular uprising in 1986, dies of a heart attack.

December
 December 14 - Laurent Lamothe resigns as Prime Minister of Haiti along with several ministers following violent protests and a commission's call for him to step down. The protesters have been demanding the holding of early elections.

Deaths

October
 October 4: Jean-Claude Duvalier

References

 
Haiti
2010s in Haiti
Haiti
Years of the 21st century in Haiti